Eurus Energy Holdings Corporation is a holding company of the Eurus Energy Group, Japan's largest wind power developer. Eurus Energy is a joint venture of Toyota Tsusho Corporation and Tokyo Electric Power Company (TEPCO) and is headquartered in Minato-ku, Tokyo. It is an Independent Power Producer involved in wind power and photovoltaic power projects in the United States, the United Kingdom, Italy, Spain, Norway, Japan, and South Korea. The total capacity of power plants in operation is 1,986.23 megawatts. "Eurus" is the god of the east wind in Greek mythology.

Projects

Japan 
Eurus Energy Japan Corporation owns the following onshore wind farms operated by its subsidiaries in Japan.

In operation

Under construction 
Two wind farms are under construction.

See also 
 Wind power in Japan

References

External links 
 Eurus Energy Holdings
 Eurus Energy America Corporation
 Gallery 

Holding companies based in Tokyo
Wind power companies of Japan
Solar energy companies of Japan
Energy companies based in Tokyo
Tokyo Electric Power Company
Toyota Tsusho
Japanese companies established in 2001
Energy companies established in 2001
Holding companies established in 2001
Renewable resource companies established in 2001